is a Filipino chicken soup made from chicken in coconut milk with green papaya and other vegetables, garlic, ginger, onion,  (fish sauce) or  (shrimp paste), and salt and pepper. A common variant of the dish adds curry powder or non-native Indian spices and is known as Filipino chicken curry.

Description
 is ideally made with native chickens (traditionally raised in Filipino backyards). It is first sautéed with garlic, onion, and ginger (or turmeric) until lightly browned. Coconut milk is then added along with vegetables like green papaya (or chayote), leafy vegetables (including pechay, spinach, moringa leaves, etc.), and peppers (usually bell peppers or siling haba). Coconut cream is usually added shortly before it is cooked and simmered in low heat.

Variants
It is also more likely to use potatoes or carrots in place of green papaya or chayote.

Similar dishes

See also
Pininyahang manok
Tiyula itum
Coconut soup
List of dishes using coconut milk

References

Philippine soups
Philippine chicken dishes
Foods containing coconut